Marco Baldauf  (born April 16, 1990 Rosenheim, Germany)has been playing Chess since he was eight years old. He was the German Junior Champion in the year 2000 and 2002. He become FIDE Master(FM)  in 2008 and International Master (IM) in 2014.He earned Grandmaster (GM) title in 2019. He plays for SF Berlin in the Bundesliga. He works as a policy advisor in Berlin.

Notable Tournaments

References 

Living people
1990 births
People from Rosenheim
Sportspeople from Upper Bavaria
21st-century chess players
Chess grandmasters
German chess players